Jean Chalopin (born 31 May 1950) is a French bank executive. During the 1980s and early 1990s, he produced a range of successful animated series, first as the founder and president of the production company DIC, then at his newly created company C&D from 1987. He is probably most well-known as the co-creator of Inspector Gadget, as well as the co-writer and producer of The Mysterious Cities of Gold. He currently heads Bahamas-based Deltec Bank.

Career
In 1971, with the backing of Radio Television Luxembourg, Chalopin formed the company Diffusion, Information Communications (DIC) which later evolved into DIC Entertainment. At DIC, he wrote and produced programmes animated by overseas studios.  DIC's first major series were the French-Japanese co-productions Ulysses 31 and The Mysterious Cities of Gold, which Chalopin produced and co-wrote. Subsequently, he co-created Inspector Gadget together with Andy Heyward and Bruno Bianchi; its launch in 1983, concurrently with The Littles, marked DIC's foray into the American marketplace.

In 1987, Chalopin founded the company Créativité et Développement, aka C&D (eng: Creativity and Development), after selling his shares in DIC, and continued to produce cartoons in the late 1980s and 1990s. C&D had offices in Paris and Tokyo while setting up Jetlag Productions as its American affiliated company. C&D had purchased the DIC library foreign distribution rights from Saban Entertainment soon after Saban had acquired them from DIC in 1987. In 1996, Chalopin sold the C&D library to Fox Kids Worldwide, while the company itself was absorbed into Saban International Paris.

After moving to the Bahamas in 1987, Chalopin began investing in Deltec Bank and Trust, eventually becoming its largest shareholder and chairman. According to Chalopin, as chairman he sought out smaller technology-related businesses, including Tether and its controlling company Bitfinex in 2018. At that time, Deltec was the only bank willing to work with the cryptocurrency.

Screenwriting credits

Television
 Ulysses 31 (1981–1982)*
 The Mysterious Cities of Gold (1982–1983)*
 Pole Position (1984)*
 Jayce and the Wheeled Warriors (1985–1986)
 The New Adventures of He-Man (1990)
 Adventures of the Little Mermaid (1991)*
 The Twins of Destiny (1991–1992)*
 The Adventures of T-Rex (1992–1993)*
 Around the World in Eighty Dreams (1992)
 King Arthur and the Knights of Justice (1992–1993)*
 Conan the Adventurer (1993)
 The Bots Master (1993–1994)*
 Happy Ness: The Secret of the Loch (1995)*
 Space Strikers (1995)*
 Littlest Pet Shop (1995)
 Gadget & the Gadgetinis (2002–2003)*
 Sabrina’s Secret Life (2003–2004)*
 The Mysterious Cities of Gold (2012–2013)

Film
 Rainbow Brite and the Star Stealer (1985)

 * = head writer

Producer

Television
 Ulysses 31 (1981–1982)
 The Littles (1983–1985)
 Inspector Gadget (1983–1986)
 Kidd Video (1984)
 The Get Along Gang (1984)
 Pole Position (1984)
 Heathcliff (1984–1985)
 Rainbow Brite (1984–1986)
 Care Bears (1985)
 Hulk Hogan’s Rock ‘n’ Wrestling (1985–1986)
 Jayce and the Wheeled Warriors (1985–1986)
 M.A.S.K. (1985–1986)
 Photon (1986–1987)
 Popples (1986–1987)
 The Adventures of Teddy Ruxpin (1986–1987)
 Zoobilee Zoo (1986–1987)
 Dennis the Menace (1986–1988)
 Kissyfur (1986–1990)
 The Real Ghostbusters (1986–1991)
 The New Adventures of He-Man (1990)
 The Twins of Destiny (1991–1992)*
 King Arthur and the Knights of Justice (1992–1993)
 The Adventures of T-Rex (1992–1993)
 Conan the Adventurer (1993)
 The Bots Master (1993–1994)
 Littlest Pet Shop (1995)
 Space Strikers (1995)

Film
 Poochie (1984)
 Here Come the Littles (1985)
 Rainbow Brite and the Star Stealer (1985)
 Heathcliff: The Movie (1986)
 Liberty (1986)
 The Kingdom Chums: Little David’s Adventure (1986)
 Inspector Gadget Saves Christmas (1992)

See also

References

External links
 

1950 births
Living people
20th-century French screenwriters
21st-century French screenwriters
French bankers
French film producers
French male screenwriters
French television company founders
Mass media people from Tours, France
20th-century French male writers
21st-century French male writers
Businesspeople from Tours, France